Fabianów may refer to places in Poland:
Fabianów, Ostrów Wielkopolski County in Greater Poland Voivodeship (west-central Poland)
Fabianów, Pleszew County in Greater Poland Voivodeship (west-central Poland)
Fabianów, Masovian Voivodeship (east-central Poland)